Fortex Group Ltd (in Receivership and Liquidation) v MacIntosh [1998] 3 NZLR 171 is a cited case in New Zealand regarding constructive trusts.

References

Court of Appeal of New Zealand cases
1998 in New Zealand law